JRT may refer to:

 JRT (programming language), an implementation of Pascal
 Jack Russell Terrier, a dog breed
 Chakato language, spoken in Nigeria, ISO 639-3 code
 Journal of Reformed Theology
 Junctional reciprocating tachycardia, an abnormal heart condition
 Yugoslav Radio Television
 Shikoku Broadcasting, Tokushima, Japan